USS Raven was a transport and supply ship that served in the United States Navy from 1813 to 1815.
 
Raven was serving as the merchant schooner Mary on Lake Ontario when the U.S. Navy purchased her on 6 February 1813 for use in the War of 1812. Renamed Raven, she was fitted out as a bomb vessel, but instead served as a transport and supply ship during the war.

Raven was sold at Sackets Harbor, New York, on 15 May 1815.

References
 

Schooners of the United States Navy
War of 1812 ships of the United States
Great Lakes freighters
1813 ships